Ethernet exchange is a physical network infrastructure through which Ethernet service providers, carriers and Internet service providers exchange Ethernet traffic between their networks. The Ethernet exchange was created as a neutral meeting place where wireless carriers can connect to multiple Ethernet services in several markets that need access to specific locations though one connection.  As service providers and operators continue to grow, they need a network to support the increasing amount of data and video on mobile networks. Thus, allowing Ethernet sellers connecting to an Ethernet exchange immediate access to the buyers and a more basic technical process.

Ethernet exchanges offer an accelerated system for carriers and worldwide service providers to extend market reach and coverage. Many carriers and service providers have adopted this technology due to the refined administration features and lower costs when compared to older wholesale Ethernet interconnectivity solutions.

References

External links 
 expereo.com
 neutraltandem.com
 telx.com
 equinix.com
 cenx.com
 metroethernetforum.org/index.php

Exchange
Network topology